Suchov is a municipality and village in Hodonín District in the South Moravian Region of the Czech Republic. It has about 500 inhabitants.

Notable people
Tomáš Zajíc (born 1996), footballer

References

Villages in Hodonín District
Horňácko